Sieraków is a village in the administrative district of Gmina Izabelin, within Warsaw West County, Masovian Voivodeship, in east-central Poland.

The village has an approximate population of 450.

References

Villages in Warsaw West County